Rnd may refer to:

 Rnd (GTPase)
 Rnd (GTPase)
 Rnd (trigraph)
 Ruund language (ISO 639:rnd)

See also
 RND (disambiguation)
 Rand (disambiguation)
 R+D